Bjørn Atle Holter-Hovind (born 14 April 1944) is a Norwegian media and corporate executive.
    
He was born in Oslo and has the siv.øk. degree. In the 1970s he worked in the insurance company Storebrand-Norden, in the Ministry of Industry and the Ministry of Trade. He was the chief executive of Custos Finans from 1979 to 1986 and TV 2 from 1991 to 1993. He has also chaired Aftenposten and Schibsted.

He is married and resides in Setskog.

References

1944 births
Living people
Businesspeople from Oslo
People from Aurskog-Høland
Norwegian businesspeople in insurance
Aftenposten people
TV 2 (Norway) people
Norwegian television executives
Television people from Oslo